King's Wood Symphony is a musical composition by Matthew King, specifically designed to be performed in a large open, outdoor space and lasting approximately an hour. The original scoring is for a minimum of 19 French horns with electronics, percussion and wind-up gramophones. The electro-acoustic score (realised by the composer Nye Parry working in collaboration with Matthew King) consists of horn sounds, treated and altered electronically to suggest an ensemble of invisible and mysteriously ‘different’ horns.  The gramophone installation (devised by composer Mike Roberts working in collaboration with Matthew King and students from The Guildhall School of Music and Drama) features sonic sculptures produced in workshops with children from two secondary schools - St Marylebone School for Girls, London and Norton Knatchbull School, Kent.

The composition (commissioned jointly by Stour Valley Arts in Kent and the Wigmore Hall in London) draws on the historical connotations of the horn in relation both to musical history and its ancient use as a hunting instrument as well as the horn’s more recent association with Romanticism and the orchestral repertoire. At the start of the work, simple calls are passed from solo to duo to trio to quartet to sextet, ending with responses from an ensemble of extra horns and electronics. As the piece progresses, the different groups begin to walk to new positions so that the music takes on an element of mobility. A chain of calls continues to sound across the space, as each group of players respond to each other over large distances. This chain of responses develops into more elaborate music as the groups move closer together culminating in a final section where the entire ensemble of horns joins together. A quodlibet with all the main themes in counterpoint leads to a coda in which groups of horn calls are answered by electronic responses from another part of the forest.

The critic, Robert Maycock, was present at the premiere of the symphony, in June 2007, when a torrential thunderstorm interrupted the performance. He wrote of the event:

Unfinished symphonies have a certain hold on the imagination.. but the North Downs' contribution to the subgenre will take some beating: a site-specific symphony, one that could never sound the same way twice, in which rain stopped play... The audience followed a path through the forest and the weather turned the first 15 minutes into a magical experience, and the next into something like the band that played as the Titanic went down.

The first complete performance took place in September 2007 in King's Wood, Challock, Kent (UK). The performance covered roughly three quarters of a mile of forest and involved 20 French horns and electronics as well as an installation of 12 horn-gramophones and a percussion ensemble playing separate but related material (not reproduced in this score). The audience was encouraged to move freely around the forest. Each listener was given a map with a suggested route which would allow them to hear the piece from numerous perspectives. One significant element of the King’s Wood Symphony is that members of the audience hear the score in strikingly different ways depending on their aural perspective in relation to the performance.

The instrumentation of King's Wood Symphony is as follows:

 Horn Solo
 Horn Duo
 Horn Trio
 Horn Quartet
 Horn Sextet
 Extra horn group in 3 parts
 Electronics

Optional elements:

 Percussion ensemble of gongs and log drums (separate score)
 16 horn gramophones

In the first performance of King’s Wood Symphony, horn students from the Royal Academy of Music, London and Chethams School of Music, Manchester along with members of the British horn Society were led by Richard Watkins. The performance was conducted by Matthew King. Electronics were operated by Nye Parry. The percussion was performed by Sekgura.

Two Chamber versions of King’s Wood Symphony were premiered in the Wigmore Hall in June 2007. The first is a trio for horn, violin and piano; the second is for a dectet of horns and electronics  distributed around the hall. Both pieces use material from the original score. In the Trio, new material for violin and piano counterpoint with the original material in the solo horn part. The dectet is a reduction of the larger work for standard concert performance.

References 

Compositions by Matthew King
2007 compositions
21st-century symphonies
Commissioned music